Peter Braid (born January 7, 1964) is a Canadian businessman and former politician, who served as the Member of Parliament for Kitchener—Waterloo from 2008 to 2015. While in office he served as Parliamentary Secretary for Infrastructure and Communities. He is a member of the Conservative Party of Canada.

Career
Braid has worked as a communications consultant and also in the constituency office of former MP Walter McLean, as an employee of the Immigration and Refugee Board. More recently he has worked as director of operations at Sun Life Financial and as an Account Manager with Quarry Integrated Communications in Waterloo. He is a former member of the Waterloo Economic Development Committee and the board of the Conservative riding association in Kitchener—Waterloo.

He was elected to represent the electoral district of Kitchener—Waterloo in the 2008 Canadian federal election, defeating incumbent Andrew Telegdi by a margin of 17 votes. A judicial recount confirmed the margin of victory on November 1, 2008. On May 2, 2011, Braid was re-elected as Member of Parliament for Kitchener—Waterloo, this time defeating Telegdi by 2,144 votes. On September 19, 2014, he was appointed as Parliamentary Secretary for Infrastructure and Communities.

In the 2015 federal election, Braid sought re-election in the newly drawn district of Waterloo, which contained the bulk of his old district.  He was defeated by Liberal candidate Bardish Chagger, a former staffer for Andrew Telegdi.

Political issues and record
On November 19, 2010, Braid tabled Motion 559 in the House of Commons, which asked the Standing Committee on Finance to review the charitable tax credit and the proposal to remove capital gains tax from donations of private company shares and real estate. On March 2, 2011, the House passed Braid's motion unanimously.

On October 1, 2012, Braid introduced Bill C-458 in the House of Commons, which would have established a National Charities Week in Canada, and amended the Income Tax Act to move the annual deadline for charitable donations for income tax purposes. Bill C-458 passed Second Reading in the House of Commons unanimously on May 29, 2013, but was later withdrawn upon Braid's appointment as Parliamentary Secretary. Under House of Commons rules, Parliamentary Secretaries are unable to sponsor Private Member's Business.

Education
Braid attended both the University of Waterloo and the University of Toronto, graduating from the latter in 1989 with a degree in international relations.

Electoral record

See also
 List of University of Waterloo people

References

External links

1964 births
Conservative Party of Canada MPs
Living people
Members of the House of Commons of Canada from Ontario
Politicians from Kitchener, Ontario
University of Toronto alumni
University of Waterloo alumni
21st-century Canadian politicians